Illinois Route 180 (IL 180) is a  north–south state road located in Knox County in the central portion of the U.S. state of Illinois. It runs from U.S. Route 150 south of Williamsfield north to Illinois Route 17 south of Galva.

Route description 
Route 180 begins at a junction with US 150 south of Williamsfield. From here, the route heads north into Williamsfield. After passing through Williamsfield, the highway continues north through a rural area. The route briefly turns west near Snakeden Hollow State Fish and Wildlife Area before curving north and meeting Illinois Route 167 at its eastern terminus east of Victoria. Route 180 continues north past this junction and passes the community of Centerville. Past Centerville, the highway continues through farmland until its northern terminus at Route 17 south of Galva. Illinois Route 180 is a two-lane road for its entire length.

History 
SBI Route 180 was established in 1924. Its routing has not changed since its establishment.

Major intersections

References 

180
Transportation in Knox County, Illinois